Cessières is a former commune in the Aisne department in Hauts-de-France in northern France. On 1 January 2019, it was merged into the new commune Cessières-Suzy.

Population

See also
Communes of the Aisne department

References

Former communes of Aisne
Aisne communes articles needing translation from French Wikipedia
Populated places disestablished in 2019